Traditional candy and coconut wrap (Mandarin táng cōng bǐng, literally "sugar onion cake") is a traditional Cantonese snack. It is usually found on the street, where hawkers keep the wraps in a transparent metal box to sell. It is a wrap with hard sugar (candy and coconut) inside white wafer slice. It was especially famous in Hong Kong during the 1940s and 50s. The most popular fillings included shredded coconut, maltose and sesame.

History
There are several folktales about how traditional candy and coconut wrap first appeared in China.

Monarchy period

In the monarchy period, elder members of a family would offer pancakes flavored with sugar as sacrifices to Confucius when their children reached school age. Those pancakes were flavored with syrups shaped like scallion, thus they were named as candy and coconut wrap (Tang Cong Bing). The elder generation gave those pancakes to their children to eat after offering them to Confucius for blessings. As the Chinese pronunciation of “scallion” is the same as “clever” (‘cong’), it symbolizes that their children would become cleverer after eating those pancakes. The candy and coconut wrap is still famous in China as an inexpensive snack.

Cold Food Festival 
At some point between the Spring and Autumn Period and the early Han, veneration of the 7th-century-BC Jin noble Jie Zhitui as an immortal developed into the Cold Food Festival, when fire was avoided for up to a month around midwinter. This later moved to the Qingming solar term and became modern China's Tomb Sweeping Festival. Thin wraps around molded syrups shaped like scallions became popular in Chaoshan and developed into the candy and coconut wrap.

Qing Dynasty 
Some said the coconut candy has emerged since Qing dynasty. It is believed that the traditional coconut candy came from the period of Japanese occupation of Taiwan. At that time, the Japanese government required the all Taiwanese to ship the Taiwan sucrose to Japan. The local sucrose factory staff did not want to do so. Therefore, they turned all the sucrose into coconut candy to mislead the Japanese army. After that, the coconut candy was widely spread all around the world and some people wrapped it with wafer slide as a snack, which became the traditional candy and coconut wrap.

Preparation
To produce the traditional candy and coconut wraps, wafer slices, coconut flakes, sugar, water, cake flour are needed. First is to make the candy and coconut. Add white sugar to water, stir it and boil it until 120 degrees to make a syrup. Then pour the syrup into a bowl of cold water and cool it for a while. Use a round stick to drag the cooled syrup up and down for 10 minutes. Fill it with air to form the small tubes, then cool it again. Cut the cooled syrup into strips of 3 inches long, and add peanut powder; the candy and coconut is done.

Next, is the wraps. Add water to cake flour, stir it and pour it onto a hot pan, take it up in 10 seconds. Pour black sesame powder and put the coconut candy on the pancake. Wrap it into a roll, then the coconut candy wrap is done.

Present situation

Compared to the past, there is no significant change on the package of the wraps, the wraps are still kept in the transparent plastic box for sale.

In the recent decade, the traditional candy and coconut wraps are seldom found on the streets, few elderly hawkers holding the metal box with wraps can be seen. Also, The Hawker Control Team of the Food and Environmental Department enforces the law strictly against unlicensed hawking activities. Yet, the price of the wraps is usually below HKD$10. The complex craftsmanship of making the wrap and low profit make it hard for the peddlers to sustain the business. Therefore, only few who can master the craft remains.

The traditional candy and coconut wrap can still be found in some places like Sheung Shui Railway Station from time to time. It also appears at the flower market during the Lunar New Year as a kind of Hong Kong nostalgic snacks. People today not only treat the wrap as a kind of snacks, but also a yearning for the old days.

References

Cantonese cuisine